Alexander Hogan Plantation is a historic archaeological site located near Chapel Hill, Orange County, North Carolina.  The site was inhabited between 1838 and 1890, and consists of four stone outbuilding foundations, a chimney fall, and a cemetery.

It was listed on the National Register of Historic Places in 1996.

Gallery

References

Archaeological sites on the National Register of Historic Places in North Carolina
Buildings and structures in Chapel Hill-Carrboro, North Carolina
National Register of Historic Places in Orange County, North Carolina
Plantation houses in North Carolina
Demolished buildings and structures in North Carolina